The Samoanische Zeitung, later known as the Samoa Times, was a newspaper in Samoa published in both English and German.

History
The paper was first published on 6 April 1901, and was a successor to the Samoa Weekly Herald, which had ceased publication on 28 August 1900. The new newspaper initially ran with the first half in German edited by Emil Luebke and the second in English edited by F. Muller. Muller was replaced as the English language editor by James Ah Sue in 1910. After the occupation of Samoa by New Zealand at the start of World War I, it was renamed the Samoa Times and switched to printing primarily in English, with a German supplement. Sue bought the newspaper in 1916, but died in 1918. The Times ceased publication on 28 February 1930, and was replaced by the Samoa Herald and then the Western Samoa Mail.

References

Publications established in 1901
Newspapers published in Samoa
History of Samoa
German-language newspapers published in Oceania
Publications disestablished in 1901
1901 establishments in Samoa
1930s disestablishments in Western Samoa Trust Territory